Jeff Richards is a former American football coach who was best known for his tenure as interim head football coach at Jacksonville State University after Mike Williams resigned after their fourth game during the 1999 season. Prior to serving as interim head coach for the Gamecocks, Richards served as an assistant coach for Southern Miss, Arkansas State, and Southeast Missouri State.

After his tenure with Jacksonville State, Richards served as an assistant coach at UT Martin and Nicholls State. After his coaching career, Richards started his own contractor business in Thibodaux, Louisiana.

Head coaching record

Notes

References

Living people
Arkansas State Red Wolves football coaches
Jacksonville State Gamecocks football coaches
Nicholls Colonels football coaches
Southeast Missouri State Redhawks football coaches
Southern Miss Golden Eagles football coaches
UT Martin Skyhawks football coaches
West Alabama Tigers football players
People from Panama City, Florida